"From the Inside" is a song recorded by American-Australian singer Marcia Hines. The song was written by Artie Wayne and produced by Robie Porter and released in October 1975 as the second single from Hines' debut studio album, Marcia Shines (1975). The song became Hines' first top ten single in Australia.

Background 

"From the Inside" was American-Australian singer Marcia Hines' second solo single, which appeared in October 1975 together with her debut album, Marcia Shines. It was written by American songwriter, Artie Wayne for his grandmother, who had told him "You can do it!! It's only life... There's nothin' to it... Just the seein' through it... From the Inside." Robie Porter produced the album and associated singles.

Track listing

 7" Single (ZS-142)
Side A "From the Inside" (Artie Wayne) - 3:43
Side B "Jumpin' Jack Flash" (Jagger/Richards) - 4:05

Charts

Weekly charts

Year-end charts

References

Marcia Hines songs
1975 songs
1975 singles
Wizard Records singles